Minoru Sano may refer to:
 Minoru Sano (figure skater)
 Minoru Sano (chef)